This article lists events from the year 2023 in Malawi.

Incumbents 

 President: Lazarus Chakwera
 Vice-President: Saulos Chilima

Events 
Ongoing – COVID-19 pandemic in Malawi

 2 January – Malawi have suspended schools opening in Lilongwe and Blantyre following a cholera outbreak, which has killed 595 people so far. Nineteen people died on New Year's Eve alone.

See also 

 COVID-19 pandemic in Africa

References

External links 

 
2020s in Malawi
Years of the 21st century in Malawi
Malawi
Malawi